Terminal Island is an island in Los Angeles County, California.

The name may also refer to:
 Terminal Island (Antarctica), an island in Antarctica
 Terminal Island (film), a 1973 American action–drama thriller film